A fool is an English dessert. Traditionally, fruit fool is made by folding puréed stewed fruit (classically gooseberries) into sweet custard. Modern fool recipes often skip the traditional custard and use whipped cream. Additionally, a flavouring agent such as rose water may be added.

Etymology 
Why the word "fool" is used as the name of this fruit dessert is not clear. Several authors derive it from the French verb  meaning "to crush" or "to press" (in the context of pressing grapes for wine),  and Alan Davidson argues that it is 'reasonable to suppose that the idea of mashed fruit was there from the start' but also points out that Norfolk fool, contained no fruit. but this derivation is dismissed by the Oxford English Dictionary as baseless and inconsistent with the early use of the word. The name trifle was also originally applied to the dish, with the two names being used, for a time, interchangeably. In the late 16th century a trifle was 'a dish composed of cream boiled with various ingredients' Davidson suggests that this is 'also the description one could give of a fool'. In support for this theory, Davidson quotes John Florio from his dictionary of 1598: 'a kinde of clouted cream called a fool or a trifle'.

History 
'Foole' is first mentioned as a dessert in 1598, made of 'clouted creame' although the origins of gooseberry fool may date back to the 15th century. The earliest recipe for fruit fool dates to the mid-17th century. The soft fruits used in fools in the sixteenth and seventeenth centuries were often boiled and pulped before being mixed with the cream. It was considered the most 'prudent' way to eat fruit at the time as there was a fear that fruit was unhealthy and so it was felt necessary to boil fruit to a pulp to make it safe. Fruit fools and creams, argues food historian C. Anne Wilson, 'succeeded the medieval fruit pottages. They were based on the pulp of cooked fruits beaten together with cream and sugar. Gooseberries, and later orange juice combined with beaten eggs, were made up into fools.' The cream in earlier fools was often left unwhipped. The process of whipping cream before forks were adopted in the late 17th century was long and difficult. The eggs used in many earlier fool recipes became less common, and now most fools are made without them.

Variations 

Originally, the most common fruit ingredient in fools was gooseberries, although other fruits and berries are known from early recipes, e.g., apples, strawberries, rhubarb and raspberries. Modern recipes may include any seasonal fruit readily found. In Anglo-Indian cuisine, mango fool is a popular variation.

Norfolk fool is an old local variation of the fruit fool, often containing minimal or no fruit. It is seasoned with spices, such as mace and cinnamon, and thickened with eggs and boiled. 

The original recipe can be found in [[The Accomplisht Cook|The Accomplisht Cook''' by Robert May 1660]]:"To make a Norfolk Fool. Take a quart of good thick sweet cream, and set it a boiling in a clean scoured skillet, with some large mace and whole cinnamon; then having boil'd a warm or two take the yolks of five or six eggs dissolved and put to it, being taken from the fire, then take out the cinnamon and mace; the cream being pretty thick, slice a fine manchet''' into thin slices, as much as will cover the bottom of the dish, pour on the cream on them, and more bread, some two or three times till the dish be full, then trim the dish side with fine carved sippets, and stick it with slic't dates, scrape on sugar, and cast on red and white biskets."

See also 
 Compote
 Crème brûlée
 Eton mess
 Trifle
 List of desserts
 List of fruit dishes
 Panna cotta
 Pavlova (food)
 Smoothie

References

External links 

British desserts
English cuisine
Custard desserts
Types of food
Fruit dishes